Spannungen ("Tensions" or "Voltages") is an annual summer festival for chamber music in Heimbach, North Rhine-Westphalia, Germany, founded by pianist Lars Vogt in 1998. It is subtitled Musik im Kraftwerk Heimbach (Music in the Heimbach power plant). Performances take place over one week in the  power station Kraftwerk Heimbach. Many of the concerts with friends and colleagues were recorded live, broadcast by Deutschlandfunk and recorded for label Avi.

History 
Lars Vogt, who appeared internationally as a soloist with renowned orchestras, was a dedicated chamber musician, focused on the repertoire of music from the classical period and the romantic era. He founded the festival Spannungen for chamber music in Heimbach in 1998, to perform annually with friends and colleagues in a historic power plant built in 1905. The festival is held in June for one week. The location, Kraftwerk Heimbach, is a hydro-electric power station in Jugendstil, with old turbines, brass features and Art Deco lamps. The festival is subtitled for its location: Musik im Kraftwerk Heimbach.

Artists of the first festival in 1998 included, besides Vogt, hornist Marie Luise Neunecker, clarinetist , violinists Christian Tetzlaff and Antje Weithaas, violists Tatjana Masurenko and Tabea Zimmermann, cellists Truls Mørk and Boris Pergamenschikow, and pianist Alexei Lubimov.

The festival held world premieres such as Volker David Kirchner's Il Canto della Notte as a commission in the first season, Jörg Widmann's Octet in 2004, and in the 20th season in 2017 Erkki-Sven Tüür's Lichttürme, a piano trio commissioned for the festival.

Many of the concerts were recorded live. Reviewer Jan Brachmann from the FAZ noted that Dvořák's Dumky Trio was played by violinist Christian Tetzlaff, cellist Tanja Tetzlaff and Vogt, as if the players took time for sinking together into moods ("für das gemeinsame Versinken in Stimmungen").

In 2020 and 2021, during the COVID-19 pandemic, the performances were played, broadcast and recorded without audience. The festival returned to performances with audience in 2022, with the motto Liebe (love). Vogt gave his last concert at the festival, playing in the final concert on 26 June 2022 with Christian Tetzlaff, Barbara Buntrock and Tanja Tetzlaff the Piano Quartet No. 3 by Johannes Brahms.

Performances

Players 
Among the more than 300 musicians who have performed at Spannungen are:
 flute: Kornelia Brandkamp, Angela Firkins,  and Antje Weithaas
 clarinet: Sebastian Manz and Jörg Widmann
 violin: Muriel Cantoreggi, Florian Donderer, Isabelle Faust, Gergana Gergova, Alina Ibragimova, Byol Kang, Isabelle van Keulen, Elizabeth Kufferath, Yura Lee, Wanzhen Li, Alissa Margulis, Anna Reszniak, Christian Tetzlaff and Hanna Weinmeister
 viola: Volker Jacobsen, Tatjana Masurenko, Diemut Poppen, Timothy Ridout and Rachel Roberts
 viola da gamba: Rainer Zipperling
 cello: , Alban Gerhardt, Marie-Elisabeth Hecker, Volker Jacobsen, Bartholomew LaFollette, Boris Pergamenschikow, Gustav Rivinius, Tanja Tetzlaff and 
 harpsichord: Kirill Gerstein
 piano: Anna Rita Hitaj, Aaron Pilsan, Artur Pizarro, Gunilla Süssmann, Lars Vogt and Huw Watkins.

Recordings 
Many recordings were made live at the Spannungen festival by Deutschlandfunk for label Avi (or CAvi):

References

External links

 
 Recordings of Spannungen Chamber Music Festival Discogs, 2022
 Pedro Obiera: Kammermusik mit Familienanschluss o-ton.online
 
 

Classical music festivals in Germany
1998 establishments in Germany
Chamber music festivals